Dugald Milton Dick (born 21 July 1972) is an Australian politician who currently serves as the 32nd Speaker of the Australian House of Representatives. He is a member of the Australian Labor Party (ALP) and has represented the Queensland seat of Oxley in the House of Representatives since the 2016 federal election. He previously served on the Brisbane City Council (2008–2016) and as ALP state secretary (2004–2008). He is the brother of Queensland state government minister Cameron Dick.

Early life
Dick was born in Brisbane on 21 July 1972, the son of Joan and Allan Dick. His father was a World War II naval veteran and subsequently established a chain of butcher's shops in Brisbane's southern suburbs, while his mother was a midwife. He attended the Anglican Church Grammar School and holds the degree of Bachelor of Arts from the University of Queensland.

Politics
Dick joined the ALP at the age of 18 as a university student and served as national president of Young Labor. He worked as an electorate officer for David Beddall (1993–1998) and Senator John Hogg (1998–2000) and subsequently as an ALP organiser. Dick was appointed as the party's state secretary and campaign director in 2004, having served as a delegate to the national conference since 2001. He led the party's successful campaign in Queensland at the 2007 federal election. He announced his resignation in December 2007 to stand for political office, effective in March 2008.

Local government
In 2008, Dick was elected to the Brisbane City Council as the representative of Richlands Ward. He was not a resident of the ward at the time he announced his candidacy, but announced he would relocate from his home in Clayfield. He was endorsed by the incumbent prime minister Kevin Rudd. Dick was deputy leader of the opposition on the council until 2012 and subsequently served as leader of the opposition until his resignation in 2016. He was also the opposition spokesman for financial services.

Federal politics
Following Labor's defeat at the 2013 federal election, Dick and Jane Garrett were appointed to lead a review into the party's campaign. At the time, he publicly requested former prime minister Kevin Rudd to remain in parliament.

In April 2015, Dick announced he would seek preselection for the federal seat of Oxley following the retirement of Bernie Ripoll. He was endorsed unopposed, and retained Oxley for the ALP at the 2016 federal election.

In July 2022, following the ALP's victory at the 2022 federal election, Dick was nominated as the party's candidate for Speaker of the House of Representatives. He was chosen under a factional deal in which the Right faction would choose the Speaker and the Left faction would choose the President of the Senate. He defeated Rob Mitchell, the incumbent second deputy speaker, with the support of the Queensland and New South Wales Right factions. On the first sitting day of parliament, 26 July, he was elected as Speaker by the House, winning with 96 votes to beat the incumbent speaker Andrew Wallace, who received 56 votes.

Political positions
Dick is a member of the Labor Right faction. After the party's defeat at the 2019 election, he stated that the party needed to "take a stronger and firmer view of talking about resources and the benefits they bring to our economy". In August 2019 he was one of four Labor MPs to join the Parliamentary Friends of Coal Exports group established by Liberal MP Craig Kelly.

Dick has been described by the Australian Jewish News as a "strong supporter of Israel". After a sponsored visit to Israel in 2017, he stated that "terms that are often bandied around – like settlements, occupation, apartheid and the wall – these are all easy catchphrases and clichés to use, and often there isn't a counterbalance given to a lot of those arguments".

See also

Politics of Queensland

References

 

1972 births
Living people
University of Queensland alumni
People from Brisbane
Australian Labor Party councillors
Australian Labor Party members of the Parliament of Australia
Labor Right politicians
Members of the Australian House of Representatives
Members of the Australian House of Representatives for Oxley
21st-century Australian politicians
Speakers of the Australian House of Representatives